James and the Giant Peach is a musical with music and lyrics by Benj Pasek and Justin Paul and book by Timothy Allen McDonald based on Roald Dahl's 1961 children's book of the same name.

After McDonald and Leslie Bricusse successfully developed Charlie and the Chocolate Factory into a musical, using songs from the 1971 film adaptation, Dahl's widow Liccy granted the rights to develop James and the Giant Peach to McDonald. McDonald started assembling the creative team in 2005. Lynn Ahrens, Freddie Gershon and Michael Kerker recommended the songwriting team of Benj Pasek and Justin Paul in 2008. After an audition where Pasek and Paul wrote three potential songs in a week, including two that would be worked into the show (James's first solo, "On Your Way Home" and "Property of Spiker and Sponge"), McDonald hired the duo.

The show was first staged at Goodspeed Musicals directed by Graciela Daniele featuring an all star cast. This production was in talks to go to Broadway following the run. However, due to mixed critical response, it was further developed by the team. It has been re-worked since then and in 2015, the new version became available for licensing through McDonald's company Music Theatre International and is a popular show in youth and regional theatre. A cast recording of this new version was released in 2015. Two other versions (a Theatre For Young Audiences version and a Junior version) are also available and are utilized commonly by children's theatres.

Synopsis

Act One
Ladahlord sets the stage by introducing the characters and setting the stage right in front of the audience ("Right Before Your Eyes"). The story starts with James having a nightmare while sleeping at the orphanage, remembering his parents getting eaten by a rhino at the London zoo. He wakes up in a cold sweat. He then explains to a ladybug and grasshopper on the ground his life problems ("On Your Way Home"). The next morning, James is informed that he is leaving the orphanage to live with his two aunts in Dover.

The audience meets Spiker and Sponge who are told they have to take care of a child. They pick James up at the train station and decide to use him as a slave ("Property of Spiker and Sponge"), that their true nature is revealed. They take James back to their house. Spiker walks into a spider-web and instructs James to cut down the old tree it was hanging from. The two aunts leave for the beach. Before James can cut down the tree, he pauses to save an earthworm from a centipede. He then raises his ax but is stopped by a mysterious man named Ladahlord. Ladahlord assists James in fixing his life by giving James access to one spell in Ladahlord's book of spells ("Shake it Up"). The potion is made, and on James' way back to Spiker and Sponge's house, he trips, spilling the potion all over the old tree.

The next morning, Spiker and Sponge take James back out to the garden to do more work. The three of them are surprised as they see a gigantic peach has grown on the tree. Spiker realizes that she and Sponge can use the peach to make money, and make deals with companies, allowing the peach to be used for much commercial use and media ("There's Money on That Tree"). James tells the aunts that he made the peach grow. They call him a liar and force him to sleep outside. James decides that he'd rather live on his own than with Spiker and Sponge ("Middle of a Moment").

James enters the peach and meets the five insects he saw earlier: The grasshopper, ladybug, earthworm, spider, and centipede, who were also grown by Ladahlord's spell. The insects have also been harmed by the aunts and want to escape too. Centipede cuts the stem of the peach and the peach rolls into the ocean and starts floating in the direction of France. Grasshopper assures everyone that they will be safe and they can rely on the current to get them to France ("Floatin' Along").

Act Two
Time has passed and all six of our characters are hungry. They decide to ration out the peach so they won't starve and won't sink. With new energy, the insects decide to entertain James with some personal facts ("Have You Even Begun to Wonder?").

Back at the aunts' house, the aunts realize they are going to get in trouble for not being able to keep all the promises they made because they lost the peach. They are chased away by an angry mob ("A Getaway For Spiker and Sponge").

Back on the Peach, James has another nightmare. He wakes up and the insects tell him about the troubles they had with the aunts. Centipede reveals he hates all humans, including James. The other four insects try to comfort James by telling him his parents' memory will always be with him ("Everywhere That You Are").

Spiker and Sponge have escaped Dover and are now riding a cruise ship to who knows where. They long over the money they could have had, but remember they still have each other ("I Got You"). They then spot the peach and redirect the cruise ship to follow it.

The peach gets attacked by sharks. Worried that it will sink, James devises a plan to use Spider's web to attach seagulls to the peach and fly out of the water. They use Earthworm as bait to attract the seagulls ("Plump and Juicy"). Centipede is frustrated that the rest of the insects are accepting of James- a human. He falls off the peach. James ties himself to Spider's web and jumps off to save Centipede. Centipede realizes that maybe not all humans are so bad, but doesn't know how to apologize.

They arrive in New York City and are attacked by Spiker and Sponge (who have acquired attack helicopters equipped with missiles) and the peach lands on the top of the Empire State Building ("Empire State/The Attack"). Once the insects and James climb down the building and are on the ground, the aunts try to take James back and exterminate the insects but are squished by the peach falling off the top of the Empire State Building.

Centipede apologizes for his actions and decides to leave, but the other insects and James want him to stay ("On Your Way Home [Reprise]"). The show ends with all the insects becoming a family and living inside the peach pit in New York ("Welcome Home").

Characters and original casts

* In the Connecticut pre-Broadway production, the role of "Ladahlord" existed as "Marvo The Magician". Both characters served as partial narrators.

Musical numbers
The following is the song list from the version currently available for licensing through Music Theatre International:

Act I
 "Right Before Your Eyes" - Company
 "On Your Way Home" - James
 "Property of Spiker and Sponge" - Spiker and Sponge
 "Shake It Up" - Ladahlord and Company
 "There's Money On That Tree" - Spiker, Sponge, and Company
 "Middle of a Moment" - James
 "Floatin' Along" - Insects and James

Act II
 "Have You Even Begun to Wonder?" - Insects and James
 "A Getaway for Spiker and Sponge" - Spiker and Sponge
 "Everywhere That You Are" - Ladybug, Grasshopper, Earthworm, and Spider
 "I Got You" - Spiker, Sponge, and Company
 "Plump and Juicy" Insects, James, and Company
 "Empire State/The Attack" Ladahlord and Company
 "On Your Way Home (reprise)" - James
 "Welcome Home" - Company

The Goodspeed Broadway tryout production opened with the song "Perfectly Perfect" during which James's life with his parents and their subsequent death is shown and was followed by "Shuffle On Through" in which James experiences being put through the system as an orphan. Beyond the other songs changing significantly in content and order, the other most notable difference is that "Right Before Your Eyes" had not yet been implemented.

Productions

2010 Broadway tryout at Goodspeed Musicals
The musical premiered from 21 October 2010 to 21 November 2010 at Goodspeed Musicals in East Haddam, Connecticut. The musical itself was quite different from its source material, but honored it. Throughout the two-month run, the show was revised. The cast featured young actors Ellis Gage and Justin Lawrence Hall playing James, Steve Rosen as Marvo The Magician, Ruth Gotschall as Aunt Spiker and Denny Dillon as Aunt Sponge. The show also featured Jim Stanek as the Grasshopper, Chelsea Packard (credited as Chelsea Krombach) as the Ladybug, Kate Wetherhead as the Spider, Destan Owens as the Earthworm, Nick Gaswirth as the Centipede, also with Nicholas Park, Minami Yusi, Marissa Palley, and Jessica Fontana (credited as Jessica Hershberg) in the Ensemble. The dance troupe "Pilobolus" were a large part of the production bringing an innovative theatrical technique of using their bodies to create most of the set, specifically using shadow technique to create a majority of the special effects. The production featured musical direction by Chris Fenwick and Dance arrangements by Sam Davis. The production was initially expected to go to Broadway but received mixed critical feedback and more room for development was seen. Pasek and Paul stated during the Goodspeed staging "we decided from the beginning that we were not writing a show for children [...] we are taking some of Dahl's darkness and expanding it even more."

2012 Kennedy Center
A work-in-progress version of the musical played at the 2012 New Visions/New Voices festival, held at the Kennedy Center in May 2012 for plays in development written for young audiences. The 2012 Kennedy Center production was directed by Marty Johnson and Timothy Allen McDonald.

2013 Seattle
In November 2013, a reworked version of the musical was presented at the Seattle Children's Theatre. After the 2010 production, the show underwent much revision, altering plot aspects and songs to appeal to a younger audience, the most notable of which were the omitting of its former title song, "Perfectly Perfect", and the discontinuation of the use of "Pilobolus".  Also, the character of Marvo, who, at times, was the narrator, is gone, and the introduction of "sophisticated" and "innovative" puppetry to depict some events, "including the show's title character, the Giant Peach." The set was also more elaborate than at Goodspeed.

Justin Paul said of the revised version: "It's certainly changed — and hopefully evolved — since we [premiered] the show at Goodspeed. Obviously, that was the first time we'd ever seen the show in front of an audience, so we learned a lot just from that… Now, we sort of put [a different] lens on it and said, 'It needs to be a show that is going to be engaging a young audience — targeted for all ages,' [...]"

Mike Spee, an adult, played James, Kendra Kassebaum played the Ladybug, and Julie Briskman and Jayne Muirhead played Sponge and Spiker, respectively. 
 The cast also featured Rich Gray as Centipede, Heath Saunders as Earthworm, Greg McCormick Allen as Grasshopper, Diana Huey as Spider, with Vickielee Wohlbach, Ian Lindsay and Auston James in the Ensemble.

2014 Toronto
In 2014, the musical made its Canadian premiere at the Young People's Theatre in Toronto, Ontario. Directed by Sue Miner, choreographed by Jen Shuber and musically directed by Jason Jestadt, it featured Alessandro Constantini as James, Lana Carillo as Ladybug, Saccha Dennis as Spider, Stewart Adam McKensy as Grasshopper, Jacob MacInnis as Earthworm, Dale Miller as Centipede, Nicole Robert as Spiker and Karen Wood as Sponge.
The show was adapted into James and The Giant Peach Jr., meant for actors ages 8–18. Its premiere was 14 October 2016, at the Kum & Go Theater in Des Moines, Iowa.

Cast recording
When the new Seattle version of the show was made available for licensing by McDonald's company, Music Theatre International, a cast album was recorded and released in 2015 as a permanently free download along. With young actor Luca Padovan as James, this cast featured Marc Kudisch as Ladahlord, Jackie Hoffman and Mary Testa as Spiker and Sponge, respectively, Christian Borle as the Grasshopper, Megan Hilty as the Ladybug, Sarah Stiles as the Spider, Daniel Breaker as the Earthworm, and Brian d'Arcy James as the Centipede. This included bonus tracks of Megan Hilty's solo arrangement of "Everywhere That You Are" and Skylar Astin performing "Middle Of A Moment".

Other versions
When Music Theatre International started to license the new version of the show in 2015, they put two other versions on the market; the Theatre For Young Audiences (TYA) version and a Junior version.

Theatre For Young Audiences
This version is like the full show but trimmed down to one act, most notably cutting "Middle Of A Moment" and "Have You Even Begun To Wonder?".

Junior Version
Like the TYA version, this is one act, omitting "Middle Of A Moment" and "Have You Even Begin To Wonder?". This, however, adds characters and features much larger cast and larger ensemble. It is rated G unlike the full and TYA versions which are rated PG.

References

2010 musicals
Musicals based on novels
Musicals based on works by Roald Dahl
Musicals by Pasek and Paul